Saber Safar Fares is a Free Syrian Army colonel, who defected from the Syrian Armed Forces to the FSA in 2013. He was the founder and commander of the Hamza Division and also holds the position of overall commander in the First Army of the Southern Front since 1 January 2015. As of late 2015, he was reportedly the highest ranking FSA officer in southern Syria.

History
In August 2015, Saber Safar survived an assassination attempt in the 1st Army headquarters in the town of Abtaa.

References

Living people
Syrian colonels
Members of the Free Syrian Army
1967 births